Cymatura strandi is a species of beetle in the family Cerambycidae. It was described by Stephan von Breuning in 1935. It is known from the Ivory Coast, the Democratic Republic of the Congo, Ghana, Cameroon, Guinea, Togo, and Sierra Leone.

References

Xylorhizini
Beetles described in 1935